Brograve is a surname. Notable people with the surname include:

John Brograve, English lawyer and politician
Brograve baronets